Newport County is one of five counties located in the U.S. state of Rhode Island. As of the 2020 census, the population was 85,643. It is also one of the seven regions of Rhode Island. The county was created in 1703. Like all of the counties in Rhode Island, Newport County no longer has any governmental functions (other than as court administrative and sheriff corrections boundaries).  All of those functions in Rhode Island are now carried out either by the state government, or by the cities and towns of Rhode Island. Newport County is included in the Providence-Warwick, RI-MA Metropolitan Statistical Area, which is in turn constitutes a portion of the greater Boston-Worcester-Providence, MA-RI-NH-CT Combined Statistical Area.

History
Newport County was constituted on June 22, 1703, as one of the two original counties of the Colony of Rhode Island and Providence Plantations. As originally established, Newport County consisted of four towns: Portsmouth, Newport, Jamestown, and New Shoreham. In 1746–47, two towns, Little Compton and Tiverton, were acquired from Massachusetts. In 1856, the town of Fall River was split off from Tiverton but was ceded to Massachusetts six years later in 1862 as part of the settlement of the boundary dispute between Rhode Island and Massachusetts. In 1963, the town of New Shoreham was transferred to Washington County. County government was abolished in Rhode Island in 1842 and today remains only for the purpose of delineating judicial administrative boundaries.

Geography

The county consists of Aquidneck Island, Conanicut Island, Prudence Island, and the easternmost portion of the state on the mainland. The highest point in the county is Pocasset Hill, 320 feet (98 m) above sea level, located in Tiverton. The lowest elevation is at sea level.

Adjacent counties
Bristol County - north
Bristol County, Massachusetts - east
Washington County - west

National protected areas
 Sachuest Point National Wildlife Refuge
 Touro Synagogue National Historic Site

Major Highways

Demographics

2000 census
As of the census of 2000, there were 85,433 people, 35,228 households, and 22,228 families living in the county. The racial makeup of the county was 91.46% White, 3.73% Black or African American, 0.43% Native American, 1.23% Asian, 0.07% Pacific Islander, 1.09% from other races, and 1.99% from two or more races.  2.82% of the population were Hispanic or Latino of any race. 19.6% were of Irish, 13.2% Portuguese, 11.8% English, 9.2% Italian, 6.3% German and 5.2% French ancestry. 92.0% spoke English, 2.3% Spanish, 2.1% Portuguese and 1.3% French as their first language.

There were 35,228 households, out of which 28.60% had children under the age of 18 living with them, 49.90% were married couples living together, 10.30% had a female householder with no husband present, and 36.90% were non-families. 29.90% of all households were made up of individuals, and 10.80% had someone living alone who was 65 years of age or older.  The average household size was 2.35 and the average family size was 2.95.

In the county, the population was spread out, with 22.50% under the age of 18, 8.40% from 18 to 24, 29.90% from 25 to 44, 24.80% from 45 to 64, and 14.40% who were 65 years of age or older.  The median age was 39 years. For every 100 females, there were 94.60 males.  For every 100 females age 18 and over, there were 91.40 males.

The median income for a household in the county was $50,448, and the median income for a family was $60,610. Males had a median income of $41,630 versus $29,241 for females. The per capita income for the county was $26,779.  About 5.40% of families and 7.10% of the population were below the poverty line, including 9.00% of those under age 18 and 6.70% of those age 65 or over.

2010 census
As of the 2010 United States Census, there were 82,888 people, 34,911 households, and 21,076 families living in the county. The racial makeup of the county was 90.2% white, 3.5% black or African American, 1.6% Asian, 0.4% American Indian, 0.1% Pacific islander, 1.4% from other races, and 3.0% from two or more races. Those of Hispanic or Latino origin made up 4.2% of the population. The largest ancestry groups were:

 25.5% Irish
 17.4% English
 16.5% Portuguese
 10.9% Italian
 10.5% German
 9.4% French
 5.0% Polish
 3.9% French Canadian
 3.3% Scottish
 3.0% American
 2.1% Scotch-Irish
 1.8% Swedish
 1.6% Puerto Rican
 1.4% Russian
 1.1% Dutch
 1.0% Greek
1.0% Sub-Saharan African

Of the 34,911 households, 26.2% had children under the age of 18 living with them, 46.8% were married couples living together, 10.2% had a female householder with no husband present, 39.6% were non-families, and 32.2% of all households were made up of individuals. The average household size was 2.27 and the average family size was 2.89. The median age was 43.2 years.

The median income for a household in the county was $67,239 and the median income for a family was $82,477. Males had a median income of $58,191 versus $43,623 for females. The per capita income for the county was $36,994. About 4.5% of families and 7.3% of the population were below the poverty line, including 10.4% of those under age 18 and 6.1% of those age 65 or over.

Communities

City
Newport

Towns
Jamestown
Little Compton
Middletown
Portsmouth
Tiverton

Census-designated places
 Melville
 Newport East
 Tiverton

Villages
Villages have no separate corporate existence from the towns they are in.

Adamsville

Bridgeport
Briggs Point
Bristol Ferry
Castle Hill
Cedar Island
Cedar Point
Coasters Harbor
Coddington Point
Common Fence Point

Corey Lane
Despair Island
Dutch Island
Dyer Island
Eagleville
Easton Point
Fogland Point
Fort Adams
Forty Steps
Freebody Hill
Goat Island
Gould Island
Grayville
Green's End
Hog Island
Homestead
Hope Island
Hummocks
Island Park
Nannaquaket
North Tiverton
Ochre Point
Patience
Prudence
Quaker Hill
Rose Island
Sachuest
Sakonnet
Tiverton Four Corners
Tonomy Hill
Tunipus

Politics

|}

Education
School districts include:

K-12:
 Middletown Public Schools
 Newport Public Schools
 Portsmouth School District
 Tiverton School District

 Elementary school
 Jamestown School District
 Little Compton School District

See also
National Register of Historic Places listings in Newport County, Rhode Island

References

External links

 Newport County Chamber of Commerce

 
1703 establishments in Rhode Island
Populated places established in 1703
Counties in Greater Boston
Providence metropolitan area